Acraea anacreontica is a butterfly in the family Nymphalidae. It is found in Kenya, Uganda and the Democratic Republic of the Congo.

Description
Very similar to Acraea anacreon qv.

Subspecies
Acraea anacreontica anacreontica (western Kenya, Uganda, Democratic Republic of the Congo)
Acraea anacreontica chyulu van Someren, 1939 (Kenya: south-east to the Chyulu Hills)

Taxonomy
It is a member of the Acraea rahira species group - but see also Pierre & Bernaud, 2014

References

External links

Images representing Acraea anacreontica at Bold

Butterflies described in 1898
anacreontica
Butterflies of Africa
Taxa named by Henley Grose-Smith